Tvrtko Jakovina (born 2 March 1972) is a Croatian historian. Jakovina is a full time professor at the Department of History at the Faculty of Humanities and Social Sciences of the University of Zagreb.

Biography

Early life
Tvrtko Jakovina was born in the eastern Croatian town of Požega where he finished elementary school and high school, and also completed his compulsory military service.

Education
He studied history at the University of Zagreb from 1991 to 1996. Jakovina was founder and first honorary member of the Croatian branch of International Students of History Association. As an exchange student he attended courses at University of Kansas, USIA and Boston College. He completed his postgraduate studies at Katholieke Universiteit Leuven. During the 2000/01 academic year, he was a Fulbright Visiting Scholar at Georgetown University in Washington D.C. Since then, he has also attended London School of Economics and Political Science, and seminars on the Holocaust in Israel.

Academic career
Jakovina has presented many public lectures and attended many forums in Croatia and abroad. He has co-authored a history textbook for senior high school students. He has authored hundreds of articles published in daily newspapers such as Jutarnji list and Vjesnik. Due to his publicly expressed attitudes on the importance of objectivity in historical studies, he has often been attacked by Croatian radical right-wingers. In his work, he is mostly interested in the history of the 20th century, American history, the Cold War, the Non-Aligned Movement, and the policy of detente. His books received state prizes in 2004 and 2014, while he also received Kiklop book prize in 2013. Jakovina is coordinator of the postgraduate Diplomacy study program of the Faculty of Political Science and the Ministry of Foreign and European Affairs.

Publications

Books
Socijalizam na americkoj pšenici (English: Socialism on the American Grain). Matica hrvatska: Zagreb. 2002
Američki komunistički saveznik. Hrvati, Titova Jugoslavija i SAD 1945.–1955. (English: The American Communist Ally. Croats, Tito's Yugoslavia and the United States 1945-1955). Profil International: Zagreb. 2003
Treća strana Hladnog rata (English: The Third Side of The Cold War). Fraktura: Zaprešić. 2011
Trenuci katarze. Prijelomni događaji XX stoljeća (English: Moments of Catharsis. Breaking Events in the Twentieth Century). Fraktura: Zaprešić. 2013
Budimir Lončar: Od Preka do vrha svijeta (English: Budimir Lončar: From Preko to the top of the World). Fraktura: Zaprešić. 2020

Political and public engagement
Tvrtko Jakovina is a prominent public critic of a violent right wing Croatian nationalism, historical revisionism of World War II oriented towards unscientific positive reinterpretations of the puppet Independent State of Croatia and absent or unscientific recognition of Ustashe genocide against Serbs, Jews, Roma as well as their crimes against their opponents.

Jakovina has signed the CIVICO Europa initiative against autocratic policies in the fight against COVID-19 in Hungary. The initiative was signed by 73 European personalities including Jean-Claude Juncker, Carl Bildt, Slavoj Žižek and from Croatia alongside Jakovina also Miljenko Jergović, Vesna Pusić, Seid Serdarević and Željko Trkanjec.

References

External links
 

1972 births
Living people
21st-century Croatian historians
Faculty of Humanities and Social Sciences, University of Zagreb alumni
Academic staff of the University of Zagreb
People from Požega, Croatia
Cold War historians
KU Leuven alumni
Georgetown University alumni